Allene is a feminine given name. Notable people with the name include:

Allene Jeanes (1906–1995), American chemical researcher
Allene Ray (1901–1979), American film actress
Allene Roberts (1928–2019), American actress
Allene Tew (1872–1955), American socialite

feminine given names